Claude Raffy (born 2 January 1945) is a French former swimmer. He competed in the men's 100 metre backstroke at the 1960 Summer Olympics but was eliminated in the heats.

References

External links
 

1945 births
Living people
French male backstroke swimmers
Olympic swimmers of France
Swimmers at the 1960 Summer Olympics
Swimmers from Marseille
Swimmers at the 1963 Mediterranean Games